The 2nd Field Artillery Regiment, RCA is a Royal Canadian Artillery reserve regiment.  It is located in Montreal and shares its headquarters with The Royal Canadian Hussars (Montreal) at the Côte-des-Neiges Armory.

Although there had been temporary volunteer artillery units formed in Montreal as early as 1828, the regiment has its origin in the 3rd Montreal Battery formed in 1855 as a result of the departure of British regular troops for the Crimean War and the passage of the Militia Act of 1855.  Militia forces, including the five field batteries formed, would for the first time be maintained at public expense.  In 1856 the Battalion of Montreal Artillery was formed and in 1895 it was renamed the 2nd "Montreal" Regiment, CA.

War in Europe
In the First World War several batteries of artillery were raised in Montreal and the 2nd Brigade included the 3rd Montreal Battery amongst its four batteries. During the war, the unit took part in every action of the 1st Canadian Division and later on the Canadian Corps. In a series of reorganizations the battery was renamed the 7th Field Battery, the name it continues to hold. This battery was commanded at the outbreak of the war by Major Andrew McNaughton.  Wounded at the 2nd Battle of Ypres, he went on to command the Canadian Corps Heavy Artillery and, in the Second World War, the First Canadian Army. The 2nd Brigade served in the divisional artillery of the 1st Canadian Division for the duration of the war.

In the Second World War the 2nd Field Regiment was once again mobilized in the divisional artillery of the 1st Canadian Infantry Division with the 7th Field Battery amongst its batteries. After training in England it served in Italy from July 1943 until January 1945 when it, along with I Canadian Corps, was transferred to Holland.

After the Second World War the regiments of artillery in the post-war Militia were renumbered and the 2nd Field Regiment was removed from the order of battle. Reorganization after the 1964 Suttie Commission and the ensuing Militia unit reductions eventually saw the 2nd Field Regiment reforming in 1966 with initially two and then three batteries. They were the 7th, 50th, and 66th Field Batteries, each perpetuating a different regiment of the post-war artillery in Montreal.

Twenty-first century 
On April 29, 2000, the regiment was awarded Freedom of the City of Montreal in recognition of its historical link to the city. Then in 2007 the city of Terrebonne also awarded the regiment the same courtesy.

Today, it is primarily made up of reservists from the city of Montreal as part of the Canadian Army Reserves. After over 50 years of peacetime operations, the regiment fields only a single artillery battery of six 105 mm C3 howitzers. It has sent its members abroad to serve in peacekeeping and anti-terrorist roles and has yearly gunnery exercises.

The regiment is commanded by a Canadian Reserve lieutenant-colonel, with a new commanding officer appointed, on average, every three years. The regiment is officially bilingual and functions in both English and French. The commanding officers of the re-formed 2nd Field Regiment are listed:

1966–1969 – LCol J.H.E. Day, CD
1969–1970 – LCol W.L.M. Cloutier, CD
1970–1973 – LCol J.R.G. Saint-Louis, CD
1973–1975 – LCol P.B. Fecteau, CD
1975–1979 – LCol T.K. Stafford, CD
1979–1985 – LCol S.J. Goldberg, CD
1985–1988 – LCol J.F. Stirling, CD
1988–1991 – LCol J.M. Pronkin, CD
1991–1995 – LCol J.M. Lewis, CD
1995–1998 – LCol D.A. Patterson, CD
1998–2001 – LCol J.G.M.B. Lefebvre, CD
2001–2005 – LCol J.M.N. Bernier, CD
2005–2008 – LCol M. Bourque, CD 
2008–2013 – LCol D. Parent, CD
2013–2015 – LCol R. Garon, CD
2015–present – LCol S. Pelletier, CD

Armoury
During November 1970 the regiment moved to its current location at the Côte des Neiges Armoury, after its Craig Street Armoury was demolished, the regiment had been based there for 75 years.

**I think we were called the RCA 101st(1966–67) and trained Saturday mornings with our six 105 mm howitzers at the Lacombe Armoury, behind the Veterans Hospital on Queen Mary Rd. In the summer we used the Hussars Armoury for training sessions!

See also

 Military history of Canada
 History of the Canadian Army
 Canadian Forces
 List of armouries in Canada

References

Field artillery regiments of Canada
Military units and formations established in 1966